Year 927 (CMXXVII) was a common year starting on Monday (link will display the full calendar) of the Julian calendar.

Events 
 By place 

 Europe 
 May 27 – Simeon I, emperor (tsar) of the Bulgarian Empire, dies of heart failure in his palace at Preslav after a 34-year reign. He is survived by four sons and succeeded by his second son Peter I, who signs a peace treaty with the Byzantine Empire. The peace is confirmed by Peter's marrying Maria Lekapene (the daughter of Christopher Lekapenos, son and co-emperor of Romanos I). The treaty restores the borders to those established by several treaties (thus recognizing Bulgaria's possession of Macedonia).
 July 12 – King Æthelstan of Wessex claims his kingdom and receives the submission of High-Reeve Ealdred I of Bamburgh and probably also of Owain ap Dyfnwal, King of Strathclyde, at Eamont Bridge. He unifies the various small kingdoms of the Anglo-Saxon Heptarchy, creating the Kingdom of England, and also secures a pledge from King Constantine II of Scotland, that he will not ally with the Viking kings. This summer also Kings Hywel Dda of Deheubarth and Owain of Glywysing and Gwent submit to the overlordship of Æthelstan at Hereford. The borders between England and Wales are set at the River Wye.
 Summer – The Hungarians fight in Rome, helping Margrave Peter against Pope John X. They then go to southern Italy, and conquer the cities of Taranto and Oria.
 August 15 – Led by the Slavic Sabir, the Fatimids from Sicily, capture and destroy Taranto. They enslave much of the population.

 Asia 
 Hubaekje, one of the Later Three Kingdoms of Korea, sacks the Silla capital at Gyeongju. King Gyeongae commits suicide and Gyeongsun is placed on the throne by the Hubaekje king Gyeon Hwon.
 October/November – The Qarmatian invasion of Iraq begins.
 7 December – The Sajid emir of Adharbayjan, Yusuf ibn Abi'l-Saj is defeated and captured by the Qarmatians near Kufa.

 By topic 

 Religion 
 The Bulgarian Orthodox Church is recognised as autocephalous, by the Patriarchate of Constantinople.
 September 14 – Cele Dabhaill mac Scannal, Irish preacher and abbot, dies on his pilgrimage at Rome.

Births 
 March 21 – Taizu, emperor of the Song Dynasty (d. 976)
 Amlaíb Cuarán, Viking king of Scandinavian York (d. 981)
 Choe Seungno, Korean politician and poet (d. 989)
 Fantinus, Italian hermit and abbot (approximate date)
 Fujiwara no Anshi, empress consort of Japan (d. 964)

Deaths 
 January 13 – Berno of Cluny, Frankish monk and abbot
 January 14 – Wang Yanhan, king of Min (Ten Kingdoms)
 May 27 – Simeon I, emperor (tsar) of the Bulgarian Empire
 August 24
 Doulu Ge, chancellor of Later Tang
 Wei Yue, chancellor of Later Tang
 September 14 – Cele Dabhaill mac Scannal, Irish abbot
 November 7 – Zhu Shouyin, general of Later Tang
 November 20 – Xu Wen, general and regent of Wu (b. 862)
 Abdallah ibn Muhammad, Abbasid vizier (or 926)
 Gyeongae, king (55th ruler) of Silla (Korea)
 Ha-Mim, Moroccan prophet and messenger of Islam
 Ibn al-Dahhak, Kurdish chieftain (approximate date)
 Miró II, count of Cerdanya and Besalú (Spain)
 Ren Huan, general and chancellor of Later Tang
 Shin Sung-gyeom, Korean general (Three Kingdoms)
 Sigtrygg Cáech, Viking king of Scandinavian York
 Zhang Ge, politician and chancellor of Former Shu

References